Hell in a Handbasket is the eleventh studio album by Meat Loaf, released September 30, 2011, in Australia and New Zealand, through Legacy Recordings (Sony Music Entertainment). A wider global release followed in early 2012.

Background
The album was produced by Neverland Express guitarist Paul Crook. Songwriters who had worked on his previous album also made a return, including Gregory Becker and John Paul White ("Let's Be in Love") and Tommy Henriksen (co-author of the digital bonus track "Prize Fight Lover"). Also prominently featured on the album is songwriter Sean McConnell, whose contributions were originally developed for Hang Cool Teddy Bear but wound up being discarded as the album took a different direction creatively (however, he is still thanked in that album's liner notes). The album was released on Legacy Recordings, the catalog division of Sony Music Entertainment, which overseas Meat Loaf's back catalog of releases on the Sony-owned Epic and Arista labels.

Due to the lengthy gaps between releases in various regions, Meat Loaf has intimated in response to public demand that there is still time for longtime collaborator Jim Steinman to make a contribution to the album in its internationally released form. Meat Loaf concluded by noting "don't rule it out." This was a more specific variation on a previous statement, namely that he would work with Steinman again but that Steinman "doesn't know it yet." Speculation has since occurred as to what the contribution may be. As recently as September 2008, Steinman stated on his website he was creating an album as a promotional tie-in to the forthcoming Bat Out of Hell musical with a working title of Bat Out of Hell: The Climax or The Final at Bat, which would feature "new versions of classic BOOH 1&2 songs, and ALL the brand newest songs, sung by many amazing artists." He hastened to add that there was "NO REASON Meat couldnt [sic] sing these too."

Title
The title "Hell in a Handbasket" refers to the popular saying that things are going "to hell in a handbasket." According to Meat Loaf, he chose the title because "the world's gone to hell in a handbasket and every day that I listen to the news, I think the handbasket is getting bigger."

Singles
"Stand in the Storm", featuring special guest appearances from Meat Loaf's Celebrity Apprentice teammates Mark McGrath, John Rich, and Lil Jon, was the first promotional single released digitally in May 2011, to benefit their respective charities.

The first physical and second digital single, "All of Me", the album's opening track, was released for download exclusively through iTunes Australia on August 26, 2011.

The album's seventh track, a cover of "California Dreamin'" (originally by The Mamas and The Papas) featuring Patti Russo, was released to radio in Australia in early September 2011.

Track listing

Australian/German version

North American/European version

Personnel
 Produced and engineered by Paul Crook
 Additional production ("Stand in the Storm") by Lil Jon
 Mixed by Chris Lord-Alge

Musicians
 Meat Loaf – lead vocals

The Neverland Express
 Paul Crook – guitar, keyboards, synthesizer, loop programming
 Randy Flowers – guitar, backing vocals
 Danny Miranda – bass guitar, upright bass
 Justin Avery – piano, organ, keyboards, synthesizer, backing vocals
 Dave Luther – saxophone, backing vocals
 John Miceli – drums, percussion
 Patti Russo – female lead vocals (track 10), featured vocals (track 7), backing vocals

Regular Meat Loaf studio sidemen
 Jamie Muhoberac – keyboard, synthesizer (tracks 1, 8, 10)

Session musicians
 Ginny Luke – violin (track 5)
 Caitlin Evanson – fiddle (track 6)
 Glen Duncan – mandolin (track 9)
 Bruce Bowden – pedal steel (track 11)
 Jerry Flowers – backing vocals (track 4)

Guest appearances
 Chuck D – rap ("The Good God's a Woman and She Don't Like Ugly")
 Mark McGrath – vocals ("Stand in the Storm")
 John Rich/Trace Adkins – vocals ("Stand in the Storm")
 Lil Jon – rap, drum programming ("Stand in the Storm")

Charts

Tour
Meat Loaf embarked on the Guilty Pleasure Tour across Australia and New Zealand in October 2011 in support of the album, receiving mixed reviews for his vocal performance. The show in Sydney was recorded for DVD release.

References

Meat Loaf albums
2011 albums
Legacy Recordings albums